Electoral district of Croydon may refer to:

 Electoral district of Croydon (South Australia), an electorate of the South Australian House of Assembly
 Electoral district of Croydon (Victoria), an electorate of the Victorian Legislative Assembly
 Electoral district of Croydon (New South Wales), a former electorate of the New South Wales Legislative Assembly
 Electoral district of Croydon (Queensland), a former electorate of the Queensland Legislative Assembly
 Croydon (UK Parliament constituency), a former constituency of the House of Commons of the United Kingdom